Racing Club Luxembourg was a Luxembourgish football team which was merged with Sporting Club Luxembourg in 1923 to make CA Spora Luxembourg.

The club is well known for having been the first-ever winner of the Luxembourgish Championship in 1910, as well as the first Cup winner in 1922.

Defunct football clubs in Luxembourg
Football clubs in Luxembourg City
1923 disestablishments in Luxembourg